Belgramoni–Tacco Mansion is a mansion in the city of Koper, in southwestern Slovenia. It was built around 1600. It features elements of Renaissance and Baroque, but in general has been regarded as a Mannerist building. The mansion currently serves as the seat of the Regional Museum of Koper. It is protected as a cultural monument of local significance.

References 

Houses completed in 1600
Palaces and mansions in Koper
Mannerist architecture in Slovenia